My New Partner, also called  Le Cop, is a 1984 French comedy film directed by Claude Zidi that stars Philippe Noiret and Thierry Lhermitte. Noiret plays a streetwise Paris policeman who takes kickbacks from the minor criminals on his beat to allow them to continue but is assigned an idealistic new partner fresh from training. His efforts to enmesh his colleague in the prevailing corruption succeed spectacularly.

The original French title is Les Ripoux, backslang for les pourris meaning the rotten ones. It won the César Award for Best Film in 1985 and was followed by two sequels: Ripoux contre Ripoux (1990) and Ripoux 3 (2003).

Plot
René has spent 20 years policing a tough quarter of Paris. Passionate about betting on horses, his dream being to become an owner, he lives with Simone, a retired prostitute. He knows qll the petty crooks on his patch and lets them earn a living in exchange for favours and information. When François, an idealistic young cop from the provinces, is assigned to work alongside him, he tries to teach the new man the facts of big city life. He also fixes him up with an expensive young prostitute, Natacha. 

Slowly, François' irritating high-mindedness is worn down, especially after he is beaten up by Natacha's pimp. When the pair learn that a huge consignment of heroin is to be exchanged for cash, they decide to lift the money. The crooks give chase and François succeeds in getting away with the loot but René is caught by the pursuing police. Because his official record is glowing, he only gets two years in jail. Simone and Natacha greet him on release, and out of the morning mist François arrrives with the racehorse he has bought for Réné.

Cast
 Philippe Noiret - René Boirond
 Thierry Lhermitte - François Lesbuche
 Grace de Capitani - Natacha
 Julien Guiomar - Commissioner Bloret
 Régine - Simone
 Claude Brosset - Vidal
 Albert Simono - Inspector Leblanc

Accolades
César Awards (France)
Won: Best Director (Claude Zidi)
Won: Best Editing (Nicole Saunier)
Won: Best Film
Nominated: Best Actor – Leading Role (Philippe Noiret)
Nominated: Best Writing – Original (Claude Zidi)

External links
 

1980s buddy comedy films
1984 films
Best Film César Award winners
French buddy comedy films
1980s buddy cop films
Films directed by Claude Zidi
Films whose director won the Best Director César Award
1980s French-language films
French satirical films
Films scored by Francis Lai
1984 comedy films
1980s French films